Babylon and On is the seventh album released in September 1987 by the British new wave group Squeeze.

History
Eric "ET" Thorngren produced the album, along with Glenn Tilbrook.  The group officially expanded to a sextet with the addition of former Soft Boys member Andy Metcalfe; a bassist in that group.  But here, Metcalfe was used as a second keyboard player (behind Jools Holland).  However, despite being pictured and billed as a full member of the band, the track-by-track musician listings included with this album reveal that Metcalfe only played on three songs: "Tough Love", "The Prisoner" and "Some Americans".  Metcalfe left Squeeze before their next album was recorded, although he worked again with Glenn Tilbrook during his solo years.  The album peaked at number 14 in the UK Albums Chart, the highest ranking there for a Squeeze album, aside from greatest hits compilations, until Cradle to the Grave (2015) reached number 12.

The album was released in September 1987 and gave them their biggest US hit single, "Hourglass." The song became an unexpected US hit for the band, reaching number 15 on the Billboard Hot 100, which Chris Difford attributed to the video for the song as much as the song itself: "I would think that the video has had a lot to do with it.  It’s been played a lot, and everybody you speak to compliments you on it.  When you meet fans after gigs, they say, “Your video’s great.”  They don’t say, “Your album’s great.”  So it’s the first thing they think of."

A second song released in the US later in the year, "853-5937", also landed at number 32 on the US Hot 100.

Music
Chris Woodstra opined Babylon and On to be a "return to the more straight-ahead pop of their classic period".

Reception

AllMusic gave a mixed summary of Babylon and On. Although reviewer Chris Woodstra held the album's resurrection of older sounds to be "a welcome one", he opined that the moved seemed "forced", despite noting "some moments of inspiration".

Track listing
All songs written by Chris Difford and Glenn Tilbrook.
 "Hourglass" – 3:16
 "Footprints" – 3:49
 "Tough Love" – 3:07
 "The Prisoner" – 4:06
 "853-5937" – 3:16
 "In Today's Room" – 3:28
 "Trust Me to Open My Mouth" – 3:12
 "Striking Matches" – 3:02
 "Cigarette of a Single Man" – 3:29
 "Who Are You?" – 3:30
 "The Waiting Game" – 3:06
 "Some Americans" – 4:40

Bonus tracks on UK CD version
"Splitting into Three" – 3:35
 "Wedding Bells" – 2:21

Bonus tracks on Japanese CD version
"Wedding Bells" – 2:21
 "Take Me I'm Yours" (live) – 4:04

Personnel
Squeeze
 Chris Difford – backing vocals, guitars (1-9, 12), co-lead vocals (3), lead vocals (8), acoustic guitar (10), nylon guitar (11)
 Glenn Tilbrook – lead and backing vocals, guitars (1-4, 6, 9, 12), horns (1), keyboards (2, 3, 4, 6, 9, 10), banjo (3), lead guitar (5, 7), percussion (6), electric guitar (10, 11), acoustic piano (12), sequencing (12), sitar (12)
 Jools Holland – organ (1, 3-10), acoustic piano (4-7, 9, 11), keyboards (9)
 Andy Metcalfe – keyboards (3, 4), Moog synthesizer (4), horns (4, 12)
 Keith Wilkinson – bass (1-7, 9, 10, 11), basses (8, 12), backing vocals (7)
 Gilson Lavis – drums, percussion (2, 5, 6, 8, 9, 10), tambourine (12)

Additional personnel
 T-Bone Wolk – accordion (3, 8, 12)
 Del Newman – string arrangements and conductor (11)
 Monique Dyan – backing vocals (4, 5, 6, 10), lead vocals (8)
 Pam Baker, Stewart Dunning, Mike Sheerie, Glenn Tilbrook and Keith Wilkinson – mob vocals (8)

Production
 Glenn Tilbrook – producer 
 Eric "ET" Thorngren – producer, arrangements, engineer, mixing 
 Squeeze – arrangements
 Roger Dobson – assistant engineer 
 Spencer Henderson – assistant engineer 
 John Lee – assistant engineer 
 Lance Phillips – assistant engineer 
 Steve Williams – assistant engineer
 Gary Wright – assistant engineer 
 Femi Jiya – additional engineer (6, 7)
 Jack Skinner – mastering at Sterling Sound (New York City, New York, USA)
 Stylorouge – design 
 Nels Israelson – photography

Charts

References

External links
 Album summary

Squeeze (band) albums
1987 albums
A&M Records albums
Albums produced by Glenn Tilbrook